Tymerlan Rustamovych Huseynov (born 24 January 1968) is a former Ukrainian footballer of Kumyk origin who is now sporting director of FC Dniester Ovidiopol. He was the Ukrainian Premier League's top goalscorer in  the 1993–94 and 1995–96 seasons (both with Chornomorets Odessa) scoring 18 and 20 goals respectively, and scored 8 goals in 14 internationals.

Playing career
Huseynov was born in Buynaksk, Dagestan ASSR, Soviet Union, now within Dagestan, Russia, to a Kumyk father and Ukrainian mother. In 1970 Huseynov with his family moved to Pervomaysk, Ukrainian SSR.

Huseynov holds many firsts in Ukrainian soccer history, including being the first player to score 100 goals in official matches in Ukraine. He is also one of the all-time leading scorers in the Ukrainian Premier League with 85 goals in 215 matches. Though long retired from the national side and with only 14 caps to show for four years of service (between 1993 and 1997), Huseynov is the #10 all-time scorer (as of 31 January 2012) in the Ukraine national team's history with 8 goals.

Coaching career
After retiring from playing Huseynov began coaching at the last club he played, Signal. It's an amateur club from Odessa. He coached them from 2004 to 2007, winning the Odessa Oblast Cup in the process. In February 2007 he was hired as an assistant coach with FC Dniester Ovidiopol. In 2008, he moved into the administrative side of the club, becoming Dniester’s sporting director.

Career statistics

Club

International goals

Honours

Club
Zorya Luhansk
 Soviet Second League: 1986

Chornomorets Odesa
 Ukrainian Cup: 1994
 Ukrainian Premier League runner-up: 1994–95, 1995–96; third place: 1993–94

Individual
 Ukrainian Premier League Top Scorer: 1993–94, 1995–96

References

External links

Khokhlyuk, V. Huseynov Tymerlan Rustamovych (Гусейнов Тимерлан Рустамович). Luhansk Our Football.

1968 births
Living people
People from Buynaksk
Russian people of Dagestani descent
Russian emigrants to Ukraine
Ukrainian people of Dagestani descent
Soviet footballers
Association football forwards
Ukrainian footballers
Ukraine international footballers
FC Chornomorets Odesa players
FC CSKA Kyiv players
FC Metalurh Zaporizhzhia players
PFC CSKA Moscow players
FC Spartak Sumy players
FC Zorya Luhansk players
Soviet Top League players
Ukrainian Premier League players
Ukrainian Premier League top scorers
Sportspeople from Dagestan